The Brooklyn Exponent is a weekly newspaper serving the communities in and around Brooklyn, Michigan and the Irish hills, Michigan.


History 
The Brooklyn Exponent was started on September 1, 1881 by Charles Clough. It was a five-column quarto, and independent on all public questions. It aimed to give a fair mention of local happenings, together with general international news. At his death on September 30, 1884, his widow, Ethlyn, took over the business and ran the newspaper for eighteen years.  The paper covered the Brooklyn are, as well as the general Irish Hills, Cement City, Michigan, Clark Lake, Michigan and Napoleon, Michigan areas.

In June 1965, The Brooklyn Exponent changed its production format from broadsheet to tabloid, and expanded its coverage to the Addison, Michigan, Onsted, Michigan, Manitou Beach, Michigan and Somerset, Michigan communities. Following the closing of the Grass Lake Times in 2021, the Exponent further expanded its coverage area to include the community of Grass Lake.

As of 2022, the weekly, paid circulation newspaper is owned by The Schepeler Corporation. Matt Schepeler is the publisher of the Brooklyn Exponent.

The Manchester Mirror
The Manschester Mirror is a newspaper serving the Manchester, Michigan, community since 2013. The Mirror is printed by The Brooklyn Exponent.

The Manchester Mirror was founded in response to the decline and then closure of The Manchester Enterprise. The paper transitioned from online to a weekly print edition in 2016 with a circulation size of 1500. The Mirror was featured on Michigan Radio in a conversation about the importance of local news.

References

Attribution

Bibliography

External links 
 The Brooklyn Exponent
 The Manchester Mirror

Newspapers published in Michigan
Weekly newspapers published in the United States